Las pelotaris 1926 is a Mexican streaming television series created by Marc Cistaré, and produced by The Mediapro Studio. The series follows Chelo (Zuria Vega), Idoia (Claudia Salas) and Itzi (María de Nati), three basque pelota players who struggle to fulfill their dreams during the 1920s. David Chocarro, Alex Onieva
and Marco de la O also star. It premiered on Vix+ on 10 March 2023.

Cast

Main 
 Zuria Vega as Chelo
 Claudia Salas as Idoia
 María de Nati as Itzi
 David Chocarro as Alejandro
 Alex Onieva as Ane
 Marco de la O as Renato

Recurring and guest stars 
 Viviana Serna as Rosa
 Vicente Tamayo as Mario
 Héctor Kotsifakis as Uribe
 Antonio Gaona as Fernando Gallardo
 Krista Aroca as Koro
 Eva Rubio as Paqui
 Jesús Castejón as Augustin Galarrán
 Peter Vives as Alan Rider
 Eligio Meléndez as Pascual

Production 
On 16 February 2022, the series was announced as one of the titles for TelevisaUnivision's streaming platform Vix+. Filming began in Mexico City in August 2022, with Zuria Vega, Claudia Salas, María de Nati and Viviana Serna being the first cast members announced. Filming also took place in Madrid and Guadalajara, Spain. On 9 September 2022, a complete cast list was announced. On 10 January 2023, Vix released the first teaser for the series. On 1 March 2023, it was announced that the series would premiere on 10 March 2023.

Episodes

References

External links 
 

2020s Mexican television series
2023 Mexican television series debuts
Vix (streaming service) original programming
Spanish-language television shows
Mexican drama television series